ο Eridani (Latinised as Omicron Eridani) refers to two distinct star systems in the constellation of Eridanus:

 Omicron¹ Eridani (ο¹ Eridani), or 38 Eridani, also named Beid
 Omicron2 Eridani (ο2 Eridani), better known as 40 Eridani, with traditional name "Keid"

Eridanus (constellation)
Eridani, Omicron